Mowmenabad (also Romanized as Mowmenābād and Mow’menābād; also known as Mo’menābād and Muminābād) is a village in Hafdar Rural District,  in the Central District of Sorkheh County, Semnan Province, Iran. At the 2006 census, its population was 1,826, in 499 families. In 2019, one of the residents whose father was born in this village took a genetic test (Ancestry) and it result indicated that people from this village have 3% genes from South of Asia (India today) and 85% Persian and settled in central part of Persia (around Semnan). It also indicated their ancestors at some point moved from South of Asia to Persia through North of today's Pakistan and south of Afghanistan to settle in their current location.

There is a shrine known as Darvish Mahmoud who is believed to be a Sufi and many traditions in this village have roots in Sufi customs. Many families had come to this village to be learning from Darvish at the time.

References 

Populated places in Sorkheh County